Rodrigo Madrigal Nieto  (14 March 1924 – 11 October 2006) was a Costa Rican politician and journalist. He was the President of the Legislative Assembly of Costa Rica from 1978 to 1979. Madrigal served as Foreign Minister under the presidency of Costa Rican president Oscar Arias (1986-1990) and played a central role in reaching the Central American peace agreement for which Arias was awarded the Nobel Peace Prize in 1987.

References

1924 births
2006 deaths
Presidents of the Legislative Assembly of Costa Rica
Foreign ministers of Costa Rica
Recipients of the Order of Merit of the Federal Republic of Germany